Colobothea rubroornata is a species of beetle in the family Cerambycidae. It was described by Dmytro Zajciw in 1962. It is known from Brazil and Paraguay.

References

rubroornata
Beetles described in 1962
Beetles of South America